Hance H. Cleland (October 4, 1884 – October 23, 1959) was an American politician in the state of Washington. He served in the Washington House of Representatives.

References

Republican Party members of the Washington House of Representatives
1884 births
1959 deaths
20th-century American politicians